"Surrender" is the debut studio album by English singer Javine. It was released through Innocent Records and Virgin Records on 28 June 2004 in the United Kingdom after being delayed from November 2003. The album features four singles, "Real Things", "Surrender (Your Love)", "Best of My Love" and "Don't Walk Away". In February 2005, Surrender was certified Gold in Japan.

Critical reception

Peter Robinson from The Guardian found that Surrender showcases Javine's "versatile, seductive vocal range, often recalling early Whitney Houston across convincing forays into commercial soul and futuristic R&B [...] Surrender is proof that if the reality pop format is incapable of producing, or even acknowledging, bona fide stars, it can't flatten the talent of those who escape it." BBC critic Colette Bridge called the album "an accomplished CD that could be pilfered for single after single in a Michael Jackson Thriller style, such is the quality on offer [...] Above all you get the idea that people have spent time on this collection and not been prepared to throw something out to cash in quickly. It might sound Spice Girlsy in places but then again their debut still stands up today because of the quality of the songs."  musicOMH editor Linda Serck remarked that "the overall result is a selection of good tunes but with many destined for the skip button on the CD player."

Track listing

Notes
 signifies additional producer

Charts

Certifications

Release history

References

Albums produced by Stargate
2004 albums